Cezary Czpak (born 6 February 1982) is a Polish retired footballer, who played as a midfielder.

He was the player of Radomiak Radom, SMS Wrocław, UKS SMS Łódź, Vena Łódź, Mień Lipno, ŁKS Łódź, KSZO Ostrowiec Świętokrzyski, Mazowsze Grójec, Stal Stalowa Wola, Orzeł Wierzbica and Oskar Przysucha. In 2006, he played two games in Ekstraklasa for Górnik Łęczna; scoring the goal in the debut game against GKS Bełchatów (1–3).

He retired from football after the 2015–16 autumn round season. In his last game he scored a goal for Oskar Przysucha in the III liga match against Lechia Tomaszów Mazowiecki, as his team lost 1–2.

References

External links
 

Polish footballers
1982 births
Living people
ŁKS Łódź players
KSZO Ostrowiec Świętokrzyski players
Górnik Łęczna players
Stal Stalowa Wola players
People from Radom County
Sportspeople from Masovian Voivodeship
Association football midfielders